Saudi–Serbian relations refers to bilateral relations between Saudi Arabia and Serbia.

Establishment of relations
Saudi Arabia was the last Arab country Serbia and its predecessor Yugoslavia had never established relations, until 2013 when the Permanent Representative of the Republic of Serbia to the United Nations, Feodor Starčević and the Permanent Representative of the Kingdom of Saudi Arabia to the United Nations, Abdallah Al-Mouallimi, signed on 17 April 2013 in New York the Protocol on the Establishment of Diplomatic Relations between the two countries.

Kosovo dispute

Kosovo declared independence in 2008 and Saudi Arabia recognized it in 2009. Kosovo's independence was strongly opposed by Serbia, which has maintained the view that Kosovo is an integral part of Serbia.

During the NATO bombings of Yugoslavia in 1999, which related to the Kosovo dispute, Saudi Arabia had called for restraint. Saudi Arabia had also sent lethal weapons to Kosovo Albanian force, but refused to make a further involvement except enhancing cultural power in Kosovo.

Military relations
Since official establishment of relations between Saudi Arabia and Serbia in 2013, Serbia has emerged as a major weapon supplier for Saudi Arabia. Since 2016, Serbia has been the center of controversies over arms deals with Saudi Arabia.

In May 2017, a joint BIRN and OCCRP investigation revealed a large number of Serbian weapons have been purchased by Saudi Arabia via a Bulgarian tycoon to sell for Armed Forces of Saudi Arabia and Saudi-backed groups fighting in Yemen and Syria. The accusation on Serbia over weapon selling to Saudi Arabia resurfaced in August 2019 when Serbian weapons were found to be used by Sudanese Janjaweed with Saudi Arabia was the buyer.

In December 2019, Serbian military company Krusik had been involved in a scandal with regard to Saudi Arabia's arms deals; Serbian authorities were accused of silencing the detail to secure trades with Riyadh.

Economic relations
Since establishment of relations, Saudi Arabia and Serbia have witnessed economic trades booming. Saudi Kingdom’s two-way trade with Serbia stood at $31 million in 2017 when Serbia aimed to reach higher economic tie.

Diplomatic missions
Saudi Arabia maintains an embassy in Belgrade and Serbia has an embassy in Riyadh.

See also
Foreign relations of Saudi Arabia
Foreign relations of Serbia
Kosovo–Saudi Arabia relations

Notes

References

External links
Embassy of The Republic of Serbia in Saudi Arabia

Saudi Arabia
Serbia
Saudi Arabia–Serbia relations